Honorine Djakao Gamkoua (born ) is a Cameroonian female volleyball player. 
She is a member of the Cameroon women's national volleyball team. She played for University of Yaoundé.

She was part of the Cameroonian national team at the 2017 Montreux Volley Masters, 2018 Montreux Volley Masters, and 2018 FIVB Volleyball Women's World Championship.

Clubs 
  FAP Yaoundé (2018)

References

External links 

1992 births
Living people
Cameroonian women's volleyball players
Place of birth missing (living people)
Setters (volleyball)
21st-century Cameroonian women